Jeremy Lewis may refer to:
 Jeremy Lewis (American businessman), president and CEO of Big Fish Games
 Jeremy Lewis (gridiron football), American football player in the Canadian Football League 
 Jeremy J. Lewis, British businessman, founded the Amazon Recording Studios in Liverpool

See also
 Jerry Lewis (disambiguation)